K R Market (Krishnarajendra Market), also known as City Market, is the largest wholesale market dealing with commodities in Bangalore, India. It is named after Krishnarajendra Wodeyar, a former ruler of the princely state of Mysore. The market is located in the Kalasipalya area, adjacent to the Tipu Sultan's Summer Palace, on Mysore Road at its junction with Krishnarajendra Road. It is the first locality in the whole of Asia to get electricity and considered to be one of the biggest flower markets in Asia.

History

K R Market was established in 1928. The location of the market is said to have been a water tank and then a battlefield in the 18th century during the Anglo-Mysore Wars. From the British era, two buildings remain, at the front and back of the market area.

Present day

A new concrete 3-story structure was erected in the 1990s between the two older buildings to provide more space for vendors and better overall conditions. At the basement is an underground parking above which stand three commodity-specialised floors: flowers and vegetables on the lower ground floor, dry goods on the upper ground floor and tools and machine-tools accessories on the first floor.

Gallery

See also
 Bengaluru Pete

References

External links

Shopping districts and streets in India
Articles containing video clips
Markets in India
Retail markets in India